The Red Bull Romaniacs hard enduro rallye is a off road motorcycle race run annually in Sibiu, Romania. It was created in 2004 by founder Martin Freinademetz. The event takes place every year and attracts competitors from more than 52 + nations. The competition is spread over five days, the first being the In-city Prolog. The four Offroad race days take place on enduro trails in the regions around Sibiu and Southern Carpathian Mountains.

The event is a round of the F.I.M hard enduro World championship Series.

The hard enduro rallye
Organizer Martin Freinademetz had the idea for a hard enduro rallye in the Transilvania region after he visited the Carpathian Mountains that surround the historic city of Sibiu.

The Red Bull Romaniacs hard enduro rallye is organized under the patronage of the Romanian National Tourism Authority.

Prolog
The Prolog of Red Bull Romaniacs hard enduro rallye is held on the "Bulevardul Coposu", the main street in the city centre of Sibiu and moves to the nearby mountains and forests where the competitors have to prove their endurance and riding skills. A different Prolog course and Offroad race tracks are created every year.

Offroad tracks
The tracks crosses mountain areas, rocky ground, hills and valleys; tarmac is avoided as much as possible. The length varies between 100 km and 180 km each day depending on the class that the competitor enters. The main challenges are the technical parts, which lead through wooded areas, where competitors are challenged with natural terrain obstacles, they traverse over trees, rocks, mud, and mountains. Petrol fuel stops, or tank stops, are placed at intervals of approximately 70 km, where contestants refuel their motorcycles and have the opportunity to refresh themselves.

The track is marked with banners, signs and coloured markings, and is loaded onto a GPS in order to guarantee safety. There are also specially designed spectator points.

List of winners
Graham Jarvis is the most successful competitor in the event's history with seven overall wins.

Source: Results of Red Bull Romaniacs

Competitors 
Competitors can participate in 5 different race classes: Atom, Iron, Bronze, Silver and Gold - with Gold being the hardest. 
Event Registrations open in October for the following years event and the Amateur race class starting places are all full within days.

Television coverage
The Romaniacs hard enduro rallye has been broadcast in more than 215 countries.

References

Further reading

External links
 Official website (multilingual)

Dirt biking
Off-road racing
Romaniacs Hard Enduro Rallye
World motorcycle racing series
Motorsport in Romania
Recurring sporting events established in 2004
2004 establishments in Romania